Cenotillo is a town and the municipal seat of the Cenotillo Municipality, Yucatán in Mexico. As of 2010, the town has a population of 3,272.

References

Populated places in Yucatán